Helmer is an unincorporated community in Salem Township, Steuben County, in the U.S. state of Indiana.

History
Helmer was a town that started and grew because of the railroad it is located on. Helmer no longer has a post office nor a fire department as it merged with the Salem Center Fire Department.

Geography

References

Unincorporated communities in Steuben County, Indiana
Unincorporated communities in Indiana